Portrait of Countess Catherine Skavronskaya is a 1790 oil-on-canvas portrait by Elisabeth Vigée-Lebrun, now in the Musee Jacquemart-Andre in Paris. It was produced during her stay in Naples for its subject Yekatarina Skavronskaya's husband, Count Pavel Martinovich Skavronsky, Russia's Minister Plenipotentiary to the Kingdom of Naples. She is shown holding a miniature of her husband. The composition was very successful and at least two contemporary copies are in Russian collections.

References

1790 paintings
Skavronskaya
Paintings by Élisabeth Vigée Le Brun
Paintings in the collection of the Musée Jacquemart-André